David Rowe is a former director of the University of Warwick Science Park, in the West Midlands of England from 1982–2011. In 2006 he was awarded the Queen's Award for Enterprise Promotion- the only lifetime achievement awardee that year.

References

Queen's Award for Enterprise Promotion (2006)
British businesspeople
Living people
Queen's Award for Enterprise Promotion (lifetime achievement)
Year of birth missing (living people)